Rhinoscapha insignis is a species of true weevil family. It occurs in Papua New Guinea.

References 

 Universal Biological Indexer

insignis
Entiminae
Beetles described in 1841